Toca is the debut album by German trance group Fragma. It was released on 22 January 2001 through EMI Europe.

Singles
The album included the group's initial three singles released in the years prior and spawned a fourth some five months after its release.

The initial single, "Toca Me", was a success in the UK, where it charted at number 11, and saw mild success in Ireland and the Netherlands.

The album's second single, "Toca's Miracle", was the group's biggest hit to date, being their only number 1 hit, having topped the UK charts. It was also a top 10 hit in Australia, Denmark, Ireland and Norway.

"Everytime You Need Me" and "You Are Alive", the third and fourth singles from the album were also successes in the UK, reaching positions 3 and 4 respectively on the UK Singles Chart.

Track listing
 "Toca's Miracle"
 "Everytime You Need Me"
 "Reach Out"
 "You Are Alive"
 "Move On"
 "Do You Really Want to Feel It"
 "Magic"
 "Everybody Knows"
 "Take My Hand"
 "Outlast"
 "Toca Me"

Some editions of the album also contain the videos for the first three singles:
 "Toca Me" (video)
 "Toca's Miracle" (video)
 "Everytime You Need Me" (video)

Charts

Weekly charts

Year-end charts

References

Fragma albums
2001 debut albums